Jeff Lerg (born April 9, 1986) is an American former professional ice hockey goaltender who played in the North American minor league, most notably for the Toledo Walleye of the ECHL, and in Europe.

Playing career
Prior to his college hockey career, Lerg played for the Omaha Lancers of the USHL.  He led the league in shutouts, GAA, wins, minutes played and ranked second in save percentage. Lerg broke the USHL record for wins in a season with 36 in helping lead Omaha to a share of the regular-season title. Lerg joined the Michigan State Spartans in 2005 and was named CCHA Rookie of the Year for his outstanding performance as a freshman. He was a member of Michigan State's 2007 NCAA Championship team where he held a 1.25 GAA and .954 save percentage in the tournament. In 2008, he was selected as a finalist for the James E. Sullivan Award, given to the top amateur athlete in the United States each year.

He led the Michigan State Spartans as captain during the 2008–09 season, in which he broke the CCHA saves record and placed second on the NCAA all-time saves list on Senior night at the Munn.

On July 31, 2009, Lerg signed with the Lowell Devils of the American Hockey League. After two injury hampered seasons within the Lowell Devils, playing primarily for ECHL affiliate. the Trenton Titans, Lerg spent a season with HC Asiago of the Serie A. During the 2011–12 season, Lerg played in 24 games with HC Asiago and held a 2.64 GAA and a .921 save percentage.

On April 23, 2012, Lerg signed with Ours de Villard-de-Lans of the Ligue Magnus. After two successful seasons with Villard, Lerg returned to North America and signed a one-year contract with the Toledo Walleye of the ECHL on July 16, 2014.

On November 20, 2014, Lerg was signed to a Professional Try Out by the Grand Rapids Griffins. Following the game on November 21, the Griffins released Lerg from his professional try out. On March 9, 2015, Lerg was signed to a second professional try out by the Griffins.

Lerg was named the ECHL Goaltender of the Month for the month of November. He went 7–0–1, with one shutout, a 2.65 GAA and a .922 save percentage in eight appearances during the month as the Walleye went 10–2–1 in November. Lerg allowed two goals or less in four of his eight appearances.

Lerg was named the CCM ECHL goaltender of the week for the week ending March 22. Lerg went 3–0–0 with one shutout, a 0.65 GAA and a .975 save percentage in three appearances last week, helping the Walleye extend their unbeaten streak to eight games (7–0–1). Lerg set a Walleye franchise record for the most wins in one season, with 31 wins, and most shutouts in one season, with four shutouts. His 31 wins is tied for first in the league, while he ranks second with a 2.32 GAA, and third with a .921 save percentage.

On December 28, 2015, Lerg was signed to a professional try-out by the Grand Rapids Griffins. Lerg played in 17 games with the Toledo Walleye, ranking eighth among ECHL goaltenders with a 2.01 GAA to go along with a 12–3–0 record, a 0.929 save percentage and one shutout.

On July 21, 2016, Lerg opted to return overseas, signing a one-year deal as a free agent with Danish club, Rungsted Seier Capital, of the Metal Ligaen. After 23 games and unable to guide Capital to the post-season, Lerg returned to rejoin the Toledo Walleye on January 28, 2017.

After another season in the Ligue Magnus with Rapaces de Gap, Lerg returned for one more stint with the Toledo Walleye of the ECHL at the tail end of the 2018–19 season as an emergency goaltender. In the penultimate game of the regular season, Lerg made his lone and last appearance in a 6-3 defeat to the Brampton Beast on April 6, 2019, finishing as the Walleye's All-time leader with 92 appearances.

Personal life
Lerg is the cousin of Bryan Lerg. They were teammates at Michigan State University from 2005–06 to 2007–08.

Career statistics

Awards and honors

References

External links

1986 births
Living people
American expatriate sportspeople in France
American expatriate sportspeople in Italy
American men's ice hockey goaltenders
Asiago Hockey 1935 players
Ice hockey players from Michigan
Michigan State Spartans men's ice hockey players
Omaha Lancers players
Ours de Villard-de-Lans players
Sportspeople from Livonia, Michigan
San Diego Gulls (AHL) players
Toledo Walleye players
Trenton Devils players
AHCA Division I men's ice hockey All-Americans